David Crouch Marketing CC v Du Plessis is an important case in South African labour law, with judgment handed down on June 17, 2009, the case having been heard on May 21, 2009. It was heard in the Labour Court in Johannesburg by Basson J. Snyman Attorneys represented the applicant; Mr Macartney of Macartney Attorneys appeared for the respondent. The case confirmed a legal principle.

Facts 
On the return date of an interim order granted by the court to the applicant, the respondent, Mark du Plessis, opposed the confirmation of the order. In terms of the order, the respondent was interdicted

 from revealing or disclosing any of the applicant's confidential information, technical know-how and/or financial information;
 from competing with the business of the applicant for a period of three years; and
 from directly and indirectly—alternatively from unlawfully—competing with the applicant in breach of the respondent's restraint of trade covenant.

Judgment 
The court held that agreements in restraint of trade, voluntarily entered into pursuant to one's right to freedom to contract, are valid and enforceable unless the party seeking to escape this agreement can show that the agreement is unreasonable and therefore contrary to public policy. Whether or not the agreement is unreasonable should be evaluated taking into account all the circumstances of the case, including the relevant circumstances which exist at the time of the enforcement of the restraint of trade.

It will not be in the interest of public policy, the court found, to enforce a restraint of trade if it aims to prevent one party from participating in the commercial world after termination of their contractual relationship in the absence of a protectable interest of the erstwhile employer.

In casu, the court found that the applicant had failed to place evidence before the court to show that the information or business methods which it sought to protect were protectable. The interim order was therefore not confirmed.

See also 
 Labour law
 Interim order
 Restraint of trade
 South African labour law

References

Books
 Colman The Law of Trade Secrets (Sweet & Maxwell, 1992).

Case law
 Advtech Resourcing (Pty) Ltd t/a Communication Personnel Group v Kuhn & another 2008 (2) SA 375 (C); [2007] JOL 20680 (C).
 Automotive Tooling Systems (Pty) Ltd v Wilkens & others 2007 (2) SA 271 (SCA); [2006] JOL 18367 (SCA).
 Basson v Chilwan & others 1993 (3) SA 742 (A).
 David Crouch Marketing CC v Du Plessis [2009] JOL 23835 (LC); (2009) 30 ILJ 1828 (LC).
 Dickinson Holdings (Group) (Pty) Ltd & others v Du Plessis & another 2008 (4) SA 214 (N); [2008] JOL 21419 (N).
 Faccenda Chicken v Fowler [1986] 1 All ER 617 (CA).
 Hirt & Carter (Pty) Ltd v Mansfield & another 2008 (3) SA 512 (D); [2007] JOL 20733 (D).
 Labournet Holdings (Pty) Ltd v McDermott and Another (2003) 24 ILJ 185 (LC).
 Magna Alloys & Research (SA) (Pty) Ltd v Ellis 1984 (4) SA 874 (A).
 Plascon-Evans Ltd v Van Riebeeck Paints (Pty) Ltd 1984 (3) SA 623 (A).
 Reddy v Siemens Telecommunications (Pty) Ltd 2007 (2) SA 486 (SCA).
 Sing v Adam (2006) 27 ILJ 385 (LC).
 Sunshine Records (Pty) Ltd v Frohling & others 1990 (4) SA 782 (A).

Statutes
 Basic Conditions of Employment Act 75 of 1997.
 Constitution of the Republic of South Africa, 1996.

Dissertations
Mapiti Piet Ramaphoko. The Balance Between the Principle of Pacta Sunt Servanda and Section 22 of the Constitution in a Restraint of Trade Agreement. North-West University, South Africa. 2014.
Luyanda Nkwenkwe Dumisa. The Enforceability of the Restraint of Trade Agreement in the Context of Unlawful Termination of an Employment Agreement. University of Pretoria. 2015. Pages 4, 10, 12, 15, 16, 23, 24, 49 and 52.
Aamina Danka. A Discussion Surrounding Restraint of Trade in Employment Law. University of Kwa-Zulu Natal. 2017. Pages 14 and 63.
Musiiwa Mahangwahaya. A Critical Analysis of the Concurrent Enforceability of Restraint of Trade Agreements in South African Labour Law. University of Venda. 2018. Pages viii, 11, 12, 21, 33, 34, 54 and 80.

Notes 

Labour Court of South Africa cases
2009 in South African law
2009 in case law
South African labour case law